Checkpoint is an American novel written by Nicholson Baker in 2004.

Plot summary

The main characters are two men, Jay and Ben. The novel consists of their dialogues in a hotel room in Washington, D.C., in May 2004. The story begins with Jay asking Ben to go to his hotel room. From that conversation it is inferred that Jay is depressed: the women in his life have abandoned him; he has lost his job as a high school teacher and now works as a day labourer; he has declared bankruptcy; and spends his days reading blogs.

Jay explains to Ben that he has decided he must, "for the good of humankind", assassinate President George W. Bush, and then kill himself. Ben, who symbolises American modern liberalism, spends his time trying to persuade Jay to cancel his "mission".

The novel ends inconclusively, the reader left unaware of whether or not Jay is going to go through with his plan.

Major themes

Jay spends most of his time denouncing the Iraq War. Ben's principal argument against Jay's decision to assassinate Bush, in order to stop the war, is that killing him would provoke more bloodshed. Book reviewers and critics have identified Jay  as the political extremist in the argument of Checkpoint.

See also

Death of a President

References

External links 
 A comprehensive list of reviews of Checkpoint

2004 American novels
Cultural depictions of George W. Bush
Novels by Nicholson Baker

Novels set in Washington, D.C.
Novels set in hotels
Alfred A. Knopf books